Muljan is a village under Manikganj Sadar Upazila of Manikganj District, Bangladesh.

Geography

Demographics
According to the 2011 Bangladesh census, Muljan had 350+ households and a population of 1,394.

Administration
Muljan has 1 rural,
The Rural are - korcha Badha.
3 Mauzas/Mahallas, and 1 villages.

Infrastructure
Dighi Union has many institute. Among te institution-

 Dighi Union Muljan
 Grameen Bank Muljan
 Union Health Center
 Manikganj Palli Bidyut Samity
 Muljan Bus Station
 Muljan Jame Mosque

Roads
National Highway 5
Dhaka-Bangladesh Highway.
N5 (Bangladesh)

Education
Among the  educational institutions.

Higher secondary educational institutions
No.

Secondary educational institution
Muljan High School, Manikganj

References

Populated places in Dhaka Division